Beer in Colombia is a sizeable industry ranging from small local micro-brews to large scale productions of popular brands. 
It is estimated that Colombia has more than 15 large national brands (the most popular listed below); but dozens of small/local microbrewery boutique beers are growing beyond regional demand.

List of Colombian beers

BBC Bogotá Beer Company 
 Candelaria clásica
 Monserrate Roja
 Chapinero Porter
 Usaquén Stout
 Chía Weiss

Cervecería Bavaria 
Águila
Águila light
Águila Cero (non alcoholic)
Aguila Imperial (seasonal)
Pilsen
Poker
Poker Ligera
Redd's
Casa Suárez
Costeña
Costeñita
Club Colombia Dorada (blonde), Roja (red), Negra (black)
Cola & Pola (refajo)
– Source:

Cerveza 3 Cordilleras 
Rose 
Blanca (American Wheat)
6.47
Mestiza (American Pale Ale)
Negra (Stout)
Mulata (Amber Ale)
– Source:

Cerveza Ancla 
Cerveza Ancla Super Premium, is a Lager/Pilsner style beer, brewed under "Reinheitsgebot" the German beer purity law.
– Source:

Cerveza Casa Suárez 
Rubia
– Source:

Cerveza Colón 
Colón Negra
Colón Rubia
Colón Roja
Colón Light
– Source:

Cerveza San Tomás 
San Tomás
Hefe Weizen
Märzen
Dubbel
Bock
– Source:

Lino Brewing Company S.A.S.
COLPA - Colombian Pale Ale
COLAA - Colombian Amber Ale
COLS - Colombian Stout

Menestral Brewing Co. 

Caficultor - English Porter
Carpintero - American Brown Ale
Herrero - Red Ale
Compositor - Golden Ale
Silletero - India Red Ale
Meisterkünstler - Hefeweizen
Moulin Rouge - Fruit Beer
味の神 (Aji no Kami) - Japanese Lager
see more.

See also

 Beer and breweries by region

References

External links